"The One After 'I Do" is the first episode of Friends eight season. It first aired on the NBC network in the United States on September 27, 2001.

Plot
The episode begins at the end of Monica and Chandler's wedding. Ross congratulates Monica on her pregnancy, only to be told that she is not pregnant. Phoebe asks Monica why she told him that, saying they found the pregnancy test. Spotting Rachel desperately shaking her head at her, Phoebe quickly decides to pretend it is hers and claims the father is James Brolin.

At the wedding reception, Chandler surprises Monica by telling her that, in preparation for their first dance, he has been taking dancing lessons. However, when he tries, he finds his slippery new shoes make him utterly incapable of dancing. He asks Joey whether he can borrow his shoes, only to look down and realise that Joey is not a shoe size 11, as he claimed, but in fact a size 7. Monica finally manages to get Chandler onto the dance floor, saying it does not matter that he cannot dance traditionally, as long as she can dance on her wedding night with her husband. She tells him to keep his feet still, so he does not slip, and dance like that. Chandler starts tentatively, but rapidly gets into the "Chandler dance". He stops, though, when Jack enthusiastically tells him he is "stealing his moves."

Meanwhile, Phoebe quizzes Rachel on the identity of the father – guessing at Tag, Ross and Joey. Rachel refuses to tell her until the father knows about the pregnancy. Monica, still unaware of the truth, discusses with Rachel how difficult it will be for Phoebe to be a single mother and lists the numerous problems she will have to face. Rachel agrees unenthusiastically and unthinkingly drinks some champagne, and then quickly spits it out again. Seeing this, Monica realises that it is Rachel who is pregnant. She punctures Phoebe's facade, and asks Rachel to take another test to make sure she is pregnant, saying it will be her wedding present.

Chandler's mother introduces her date, Dennis Phillips, a famous Broadway producer. Joey, who has changed from his army costume into a tennis outfit (the only thing they had in the hotel shop), is very excited about this. Joey asks Chandler to put a word in for him with Dennis, and later on in the reception, Joey gets up on stage to do a speech that is tailored, increasingly unsubtly, to show off his dramatic skills to Dennis. He then approaches Dennis about getting an audition for his newest play, but Dennis says it is an all Chinese cast.

Whilst collecting table placings, Ross meets Mona, a colleague of Monica's. He flirts with her, complimenting her on her name, and when she leaves, he switches his table so he can sit with her, only to discover that he switched onto the wrong table – he has in fact seated himself at the children's table. Ross asks Mona to dance, but a little girl from his table asks him whether he can dance with her. Mona says she can have the first dance, and Ross, looking to impress Mona, dances with the girl standing on his shoes. He then dances with multiple young girls, but when Ross thinks he can dance with Mona, he is surprised when Gert, a significantly larger girl than the ones he has previously danced with, insists it is her turn to dance on his shoes.

Rachel, Monica and Phoebe get together in the washroom to discover the result of Rachel's second pregnancy test. The wait seems endless for Rachel, whilst Monica tells her that they will be there for her whatever the result. Finally, Phoebe tells Rachel that the result is negative. To her surprise, Rachel reacts sadly. She wonders how she can be sad about losing something she never had. Phoebe then tells her that it was positive – she had lied in order for Rachel to find out how she really felt about having a baby. An overjoyed Rachel decides she is going to have the baby, and hugs Phoebe and Monica in celebration.

At the end of the reception, Joey helps Ross – who has been injured by weight of Gert – off the dance floor. Mona compliments him on this, saying he is one of the few nice guys left in the world. Ross, spotting Joey gearing up to flirt, reacts angrily saying he is the nice guy, having to dance all night with children for the attention of Mona. Bent over in pain, Ross too realises how small Joey's feet are.

Production
As the episode ends, a title card displays that says "To the people of New York City." This card is not shown on the DVD releases of the series, but is on Netflix.

Reception
Sam Ashurst from Digital Spy ranked it #45 on their ranking of the 236 Friends episodes. Telegraph & Argus also ranked it #45 on their ranking of all 236 Friends episodes.

Ratings
In the original broadcast, the episode was viewed by 25.5 million viewers.

References

2001 American television episodes
Friends (season 8) episodes